Haruki's Theorem says that given three intersecting circles that only intersect each other at two points that the lines connecting the inner intersecting points to the outer satisfy:

where     are the measure of segments connecting the inner and outer intersection points

References

Geometry